Al-Zahra al-Jadeeda is a neighbourhood of Damascus, Syria. It lies within the Al-Midan municipality, east of the Al-Midan neighbourhood.

References

Neighborhoods of Damascus